Yrsa (minor planet designation: 351 Yrsa) is a typical Main belt asteroid. It was discovered by Max Wolf on 16 December 1892 in Heidelberg.

References

External links 
 
 

000351
Discoveries by Max Wolf
Named minor planets
000351
18921216